FA Youth Cup Finals from 2000 to 2009.

2008–09: Arsenal vs Liverpool (4–1 and 2–1, 6–2 Aggregate)

First leg

Second leg

2007–08: Manchester City vs Chelsea (1–1, 3–1)

First leg

Second leg

2006–07: Liverpool  vs Manchester United (1–2 and 1–0, 2–2 Aggregate, 4–3 Penalty shootout)

First leg

Second leg

2005–06: Liverpool vs Manchester City (3–0 and 0–2, 3–2 Aggregate)

2004–05: Ipswich Town vs Southampton (1–0 and 2–2, 3–2 Aggregate)

2003–04: Middlesbrough vs Aston Villa (3–0 and 1–0, 4–0 Aggregate)

2002–03: Manchester United vs Middlesbrough (2–0 and 1–1, 3–1 Aggregate)

Second leg

First leg

2001–02: Aston Villa vs Everton (4–1 and 0–1, 4–2 Aggregate)
Stefan Moore captained Villa's youth in the final, and was named as man of the match as Villa beat Everton in the first leg.

Wayne Rooney scored eight goals in eight games during Everton's run to the 2002 finals. This included one goal in the final defeat against Aston Villa and, upon scoring, he revealed a T-shirt that read, "Once a Blue, always a Blue."

2000–01: Arsenal vs Blackburn Rovers (5–0 and 1–3, 6–3 Aggregate)

1999–2000: Arsenal vs Coventry City (3–1 and 2–0, 5–1 Aggregate)

First leg

Second leg

References 

2000s
1999–2000 in English football
2000–01 in English football
2001–02 in English football
2002–03 in English football
2003–04 in English football
2004–05 in English football
2005–06 in English football
2006–07 in English football
2007–08 in English football
2008–09 in English football